Huriana Manuel (born 8 August 1986) is a New Zealand rugby union player. She plays for the Black Ferns, the New Zealand women's sevens team and Auckland.

Rugby Career 
Manuel was part of the Black Ferns squad that won the 2006 and 2010 Rugby World Cup's. In 2009, she was part of the Black Ferns sevens team that were runners-up at the Rugby World Cup Sevens in Dubai.

Honours 
In 2021, World Rugby inducted Manuel into its World Rugby Hall of Fame, alongside Osea Kolinisau, Humphrey Kayange, Cheryl McAfee, Will Carling and Jim Telfer.

Personal life 
Of Māori descent, Manuel affiliates to the Ngāti Tūwharetoa and Ngāpuhi iwi. Manuel's mother, Liza Mihinui, is a former Black Fern. They are the first mother and daughter to play for the Black Ferns.

In August 2021, it was announced that she would feature in the 2021 season of Celebrity Treasure Island.

References

External links
 Black Ferns Profile
 
 
 
 

1986 births
Living people
New Zealand female rugby union players
New Zealand women's international rugby union players
New Zealand female rugby sevens players
New Zealand women's international rugby sevens players
New Zealand Māori rugby union players
Rugby sevens players at the 2016 Summer Olympics
Olympic rugby sevens players of New Zealand
Ngāti Tūwharetoa people
Ngāpuhi people
Rugby union centres
Auckland rugby union players
Olympic silver medalists for New Zealand
Olympic medalists in rugby sevens
Medalists at the 2016 Summer Olympics